Oracles is the first full-length studio album by Italian technical death metal band Fleshgod Apocalypse. It is the first album to feature 'Francesco Paoli' on lead vocals. Paoli would return as lead vocalist on the fifth Fleshgod Apocalypse studio album 'Veleno' after being drummer for three studio albums, and an EP. 'Oracles' is known for its more Technical Death Metal style, rather than the Symphonic Death Metal style Fleshgod Apocalypse would adopt on later albums.

Track listing

Personnel
Francesco Paoli - vocals, rhythm guitar
Cristiano Trionfera - lead guitar
Paolo Rossi - bass
Mauro Mercurio - drums

References

2009 debut albums
Fleshgod Apocalypse albums
Candlelight Records albums
Willowtip Records albums